Daqing East railway station is a railway station of the Harbin–Qiqihar Intercity Railway and Harbin–Manzhouli Railway. It is located in Longfeng District, Daqing, in the Heilongjiang province of China.

See also

Chinese Eastern Railway

References

Buildings and structures in Heilongjiang
Transport in Heilongjiang
Railway stations in Heilongjiang
Daqing
Stations on the Harbin–Qiqihar Intercity Railway